Eleanor A. Garatti (July 12, 1909 – September 9, 1998), later known by her married name Eleanor Saville, was an American competition swimmer, Olympic gold medalist, and former world record-holder.

Garatti represented the United States at the 1928 and 1932 Summer Olympics in the 100-meter freestyle and the 4×100-meter freestyle relay.  She won a silver and a bronze medal in the 100-meter freestyle, becoming the first woman to win two Olympic medals in the event.  She was the only U.S. relay team member to compete at both 1928 and 1932 Olympics; on both occasions the U.S. relay team won the gold medal, breaking the world record in the process.  In 1929, Garatti set one more world record, in the individual 100-meter freestyle, becoming the first woman to swim under 1:10.

Garatti was inducted into the International Swimming Hall of Fame as an "honor swimmer" in 1992.

She was also elected to the National Italian American Sports Hall of Fame in 2000.

An award in her name, the Eleanor Garatti-Saville Fund, was created through a bequest from Dora Hartford, Eleanor's sister, to provide stipends to Olympic hopefuls. Inaugural grants of $5,000 each were awarded to three aquatic athletes in 2010.

See also
 List of members of the International Swimming Hall of Fame
 World record progression 4 × 100 metres freestyle relay

References

1909 births
1998 deaths
American female freestyle swimmers
World record setters in swimming
Olympic bronze medalists for the United States in swimming
Olympic gold medalists for the United States in swimming
Olympic silver medalists for the United States in swimming
People from Belvedere, California
Swimmers at the 1928 Summer Olympics
Swimmers at the 1932 Summer Olympics
Medalists at the 1932 Summer Olympics
Medalists at the 1928 Summer Olympics
20th-century American women
20th-century American people